The Directors Guild of America Award for Outstanding Directorial Achievement in Variety/Talk/News/Sports – Regularly Scheduled Programming is one of the annual Directors Guild of America Awards given by the Directors Guild of America. It was first awarded at the 66th Directors Guild of America Awards in 2014.

Winners and nominees

2010s

2020s

Programs with multiple awards
8 awards
Saturday Night Live

2 awards
The Tonight Show Starring Jimmy Fallon

Programs with multiple nominations

10 nominations
 Saturday Night Live

9 nominations
 Real Time with Bill Maher

7 nominations
 The Late Show with Stephen Colbert

6 nominations
 The Daily Show
 Last Week Tonight with John Oliver

2 nominations
 CBS Sunday Morning
 The Colbert Report
 Full Frontal with Samantha Bee
 The Tonight Show Starring Jimmy Fallon

Individuals with multiple awards
7 awards
 Don Roy King

2 awards
 Dave Diomedi

Individuals with multiple nominations

9 nominations
 Paul G. Casey
 Jim Hoskinson
 Don Roy King

6 nominations
 Paul Pennolino

3 nominations
 Dave Diomedi
 David Paul Meyer
 Christopher Werner

2 nominations
 Nora S. Gerard
 Chuck O'Neil

Total awards by network
 NBC – 10

See also
 Directors Guild of America Award for Outstanding Directing – Variety Specials

References

External links
 Official DGA website

Directors Guild of America Awards